The Ma'ale Yosef Regional Council (Mo'atza Azorit Ma'aleh Yosef) is a regional council in the Upper Galilee, part of the Northern District of Israel, situated between the towns of Ma'alot-Tarshiha and Shlomi. Its offices are located in Gornot HaGalil.

The council was established in 1963, although most of its settlements were founded in the 1950s. It was named for Yosef Weiz, Zionist pioneer of the Second Aliyah and director of the Jewish National Fund following the First World War.

Geography
The council runs along the Israel-Lebanon border. It is bounded on the west by the Mateh Asher Regional Council and Kafr Yasif, on the south by the Misgav Regional Council, and on the east by the Merom HaGalil Regional Council. Within its geographic area are several Druze and other Israeli-Arab villages.

List of settlements
The regional council provides municipal services for the populations within its territory, who live on moshavim and in community settlements.

Moshavim

Avdon
Ein Ya'akov
Elkosh
Even Menachem

Goren
Hosen
Lapidot
Manot

Me'ona
Netu'a
Peki'in HaHadasha
Shomera

Shtula
Tzuriel
Ya'ara
Zar'it

Community settlements

Abirim
Gita

Gornot HaGalil
Mattat

Mitzpe Hila
Neve Ziv

External links
 Ma'ale Yosef Regional Council website (Hebrew)

 
Regional councils in Northern District (Israel)